Australia competed at the 1980 Winter Olympics in Lake Placid, United States.

Australia came eleventh in the figure skating pairs, but that was in a field of eleven. Jacqui Cowderoy came seventeenth in the women's slalom, and Colin Coates came eighteenth in the 10000 metres speed skating.

Alpine skiing

Men

Women

Cross-country skiing

Women

Figure skating

Speed skating

See also
Australia at the Winter Olympics

References

External links 
Australia NOC
Olympic Winter Institute of Australia
"Australians at the Olympics: A definitive history" by Gary Lester  (suspected errata listed in Errata/0949853054)
"2002 Australian Winter Olympic Team Guide" PDF file
"The Compendium: Official Australian Olympic Statistics 1896-2002" Australian Olympic Committee  (Inconsistencies in sources mentioned in Wikibooks:Errata/0702234257)

Nations at the 1980 Winter Olympics
1980
Winter sports in Australia
1980 in Australian sport